Molly is a 1983 Australian family film about a singing dog which marked the acting debut of Claudia Karvan.

Plot
When weary Old Dan collapses at Sydney Central Railway Station, he entrusts his beloved dog Molly to young Maxie. Maxie takes up the challenge, developing a soft spot for her special new companion - a dog with the rare ability to sing in tune.

Cast
Claudia Karvan as Maxie Ireland
Les Dayman as Bill Ireland
Reg Lye as Old Dan
Garry McDonald as Jones
Robin Laurie as Stella
Jake Blundell as Rudi
Tanya Lester as Gina
Mic Conway as Neville
Jim Conway as Roy

Production
Molly was a real life singing dog owned by Phillip Roope who would appear on the Mike Walsh television show. The movie was originally budgeted at $500,000 but that grew as the filmmakers became more ambitious. Filming was difficult, with much rewriting on set.

References

External links

Molly at Oz Movies

Australian children's films
1983 films
1980s English-language films
1980s Australian films